Cicurina, also called the cave meshweaver, is a genus of  dwarf sheet spiders that was first described by Anton Menge in 1871. Originally placed with the funnel weavers, it was moved to the Dictynidae in 1967, then to the Hahniidae in 2017. The name is from the Latin root "cucur-", meaning "to tame".

Body size varies widely among the species.

Species
 it contains 136 species in North America, Europe, and Asia:

C. aenigma Gertsch, 1992 – USA
C. alpicora Barrows, 1945 – USA
C. anhuiensis Chen, 1986 – China
C. arcata Chamberlin & Ivie, 1940 – USA
C. arcuata Keyserling, 1887 – USA, Canada
C. arizona Chamberlin & Ivie, 1940 – USA
C. arkansa Gertsch, 1992 – USA
C. armadillo Gertsch, 1992 – USA
C. atomaria Simon, 1898 – USA
C. avicularia Li, 2017 – China
C. bandera Gertsch, 1992 – USA
C. bandida Gertsch, 1992 – USA
C. baronia Gertsch, 1992 – USA
C. barri Gertsch, 1992 – USA
C. blanco Gertsch, 1992 – USA
C. breviaria Bishop & Crosby, 1926 – USA
C. brevis (Emerton, 1890) – USA, Canada
C. browni Gertsch, 1992 – USA
C. brunsi Cokendolpher, 2004 – USA
C. bryantae Exline, 1936 – USA
C. bullis Cokendolpher, 2004 – USA
C. buwata Chamberlin & Ivie, 1940 – USA
C. caliga Cokendolpher & Reddell, 2001 – USA
C. calyciforma Wang & Xu, 1989 – China
C. cavealis Bishop & Crosby, 1926 – USA
C. caverna Gertsch, 1992 – USA
C. cicur (Fabricius, 1793) (type) – Europe to Central Asia
C. coahuila Gertsch, 1971 – Mexico
C. colorada Chamberlin & Ivie, 1940 – USA
C. coryelli Gertsch, 1992 – USA
C. damaoensis Li, 2017 – China
C. davisi Exline, 1936 – USA
C. delrio Gertsch, 1992 – USA
C. deserticola Chamberlin & Ivie, 1940 – USA
C. dong Li, 2017 – China
C. dorothea Gertsch, 1992 – USA
C. eburnata Wang, 1994 – China
C. ezelli Gertsch, 1992 – USA
C. gertschi Exline, 1936 – USA
C. gruta Gertsch, 1992 – USA
C. harrietae Gertsch, 1992 – USA
C. hexops Chamberlin & Ivie, 1940 – USA
C. holsingeri Gertsch, 1992 – USA
C. hoodensis Cokendolpher & Reddell, 2001 – USA
C. hoshinonoana Shimojana & Ono, 2017 – Japan
C. idahoana Chamberlin, 1919 – USA, Canada
C. intermedia Chamberlin & Ivie, 1933 – USA
C. itasca Chamberlin & Ivie, 1940 – USA
C. iviei Gertsch, 1971 – Mexico
C. japonica (Simon, 1886) – Korea, Japan. Introduced to Europe
C. jiangyongensis Peng, Gong & Kim, 1996 – China
C. jonesi Chamberlin & Ivie, 1940 – USA
C. joya Gertsch, 1992 – USA
C. kailiensis Li, 2017 – China
C. kimyongkii Paik, 1970 – Korea
C. leona Gertsch, 1992 – Mexico
C. ludoviciana Simon, 1898 – USA
C. machete Gertsch, 1992 – USA
C. maculifera Yaginuma, 1979 – Japan
C. maculipes Saito, 1934 – Japan
C. madla Gertsch, 1992 – USA
C. majiangensis Li, 2017 – China
C. marmorea Gertsch, 1992 – USA
C. maya Gertsch, 1977 – Mexico
C. mckenziei Gertsch, 1992 – USA
C. medina Gertsch, 1992 – USA
C. menardia Gertsch, 1992 – USA
C. microps Chamberlin & Ivie, 1940 – USA
C. mina Gertsch, 1971 – Mexico
C. minima Chamberlin & Ivie, 1940 – USA
C. minnesota Chamberlin & Ivie, 1940 – USA
C. minorata (Gertsch & Davis, 1936) – USA
C. mirifica Gertsch, 1992 – USA
C. mixmaster Cokendolpher & Reddell, 2001 – USA
C. modesta Gertsch, 1992 – USA
C. neovespera Cokendolpher, 2004 – USA
C. nervifera Yin, 2012 – China
C. nevadensis Simon, 1886 – USA
C. obscura Gertsch, 1992 – USA
C. oklahoma Gertsch, 1992 – USA
C. orellia Gertsch, 1992 – USA
C. pablo Gertsch, 1992 – USA
C. pacifica Chamberlin & Ivie, 1940 – USA
C. pagosa Chamberlin & Ivie, 1940 – USA
C. pallida Keyserling, 1887 – USA
C. pampa Chamberlin & Ivie, 1940 – USA
C. paphlagoniae Brignoli, 1978 – Turkey
C. parallela Li, 2017 – China
C. parma Chamberlin & Ivie, 1940 – USA
C. pastura Gertsch, 1992 – USA
C. patei Gertsch, 1992 – USA
C. peckhami (Simon, 1898) – USA, Canada
C. phaselus Paik, 1970 – Korea
C. placida Banks, 1892 – USA
C. platypus Cokendolpher, 2004 – USA
C. porteri Gertsch, 1992 – USA
C. puentecilla Gertsch, 1992 – USA
C. pusilla (Simon, 1886) – USA
C. rainesi Gertsch, 1992 – USA
C. reclusa Gertsch, 1992 – USA
C. riogrande Gertsch & Mulaik, 1940 – USA
C. robusta Simon, 1886 – USA
C. rosae Gertsch, 1992 – USA
C. rudimentops Chamberlin & Ivie, 1940 – USA
C. russelli Gertsch, 1992 – USA
C. sansaba Gertsch, 1992 – USA
C. secreta Gertsch, 1992 – USA
C. selecta Gertsch, 1992 – USA
C. serena Gertsch, 1992 – USA
C. shasta Chamberlin & Ivie, 1940 – USA
C. sheari Gertsch, 1992 – USA
C. sierra Chamberlin & Ivie, 1940 – USA
C. simplex Simon, 1886 – USA, Canada
C. sintonia Gertsch, 1992 – USA
C. sprousei Gertsch, 1992 – USA
C. stowersi Gertsch, 1992 – USA
C. suttoni Gertsch, 1992 – USA
C. tacoma Chamberlin & Ivie, 1940 – USA
C. tersa Simon, 1886 – USA, Canada
C. texana (Gertsch, 1935) – USA
C. tianmuensis Song & Kim, 1991 – China
C. tortuba Chamberlin & Ivie, 1940 – USA
C. travisae Gertsch, 1992 – USA
C. troglobia Cokendolpher, 2004 – USA
C. troglodytes Yaginuma, 1972 – Japan
C. ubicki Gertsch, 1992 – USA
C. utahana Chamberlin, 1919 – USA
C. uvalde Gertsch, 1992 – USA
C. varians Gertsch & Mulaik, 1940 – USA
C. venefica Gertsch, 1992 – USA
C. vespera Gertsch, 1992 – USA
C. vibora Gertsch, 1992 – USA
C. watersi Gertsch, 1992 – USA
C. wiltoni Gertsch, 1992 – USA
C. wusanani Li, 2017 – China
C. zhazuweii Li, 2017 – China

References

External links
Cicurina at BugGuide

Araneomorphae genera
Hahniidae
Spiders of Asia
Spiders of North America